Anna Ibrisagic (born 23 May 1967 in Sanski Most, SFR Yugoslavia) is a Swedish politician for the Moderate Party.

She was a Member of the Swedish Parliament from 2002 to 2004, and a Member of the European Parliament (MEP) from 2004 to 2014. She sat on the European Parliament's Committee on Foreign Affairs, and was a member of the Subcommittee on Security and Defence as well as a substitute for the Committee on Employment and Social Affairs.

Career
 Interpreter, German, Russian, and English (1985)
 Studies at the Faculty of Economics (1988-1991)
 Solo singer (opera) (1991)
 Authorised interpreter Swedish/Bosnian (1994)
 Music teacher's diploma (1998)
 Music teacher (since 1988)
 Self-employed (since 1990)
 Export manager (1998-2001)
 Managing Director of Norrbotten Chamber of Commerce (2001-2002)
 Member of Luleå Municipal Council, executive board, children's and education committee (1998-2002)
 Chairman of the Moderate Party in Luleå (2000-2001)
 Member of the Moderate Party's executive board (2001-2011)
 Member of the Swedish Parliament (2002-2004)
 Member of the Committee on Education
 Substitute member of the Committee on Cultural Affairs (2002-2004)
 Member of the executive of Paneuropa Sverige (2003)

References

External links
 Official website
 European Parliament biography
 

1967 births
Living people
Women members of the Riksdag
Swedish people of Bosnia and Herzegovina descent
Bosnia and Herzegovina emigrants to Sweden
Moderate Party MEPs
MEPs for Sweden 2004–2009
MEPs for Sweden 2009–2014
21st-century Swedish women politicians
Members of the Riksdag 2002–2006